Mykolaivka is an urban-type settlement in Dnipro Raion, Dnipropetrovsk Oblast, Ukraine. It is located on the right bank of the Dnieper, across from the city of Kamianske. Mykolaivka belongs to Obukhivka settlement hromada, one of the hromadas of Ukraine. It has a population of

Administrative status 
Until 18 July 2020, Mykolaivka belonged to Petrykivka Raion. The raion was abolished in July 2020 as part of the administrative reform of Ukraine, which reduced the number of raions of Dnipropetrovsk Oblast to seven. The area of Petrykivka Raion was merged into Dnipro Raion.

Economy

Transportation
Mykolaivka has access to Highway H08 which connects Kamianske and Kremenchuk, as well as to Highway H31 connecting Dnipro and Reshetylivka with further access to Poltava and Kyiv.

There is infrequent passenger traffic.

See also 

 List of urban-type settlements in Ukraine

References

Urban-type settlements in Dnipro Raion